VX-1, Air Test and Evaluation Squadron One, (AIRTEVRON ONE) is a United States Navy air test and evaluation squadron based at Naval Air Station Patuxent River, Maryland.

Operations
Operational aircraft are assigned to VX-1 including the P-8A Poseidon, E-2D Advanced Hawkeye, MH-60R and MH-60S. Additionally, VX-1 provides test and evaluation support for aircraft such as the KC-130J Hercules, E-6B Mercury, MQ-8B Fire Scout, and MQ-4C Triton Unmanned Aerial Vehicles.

The squadron operated two specially equipped P-3 aircraft that were equipped to collect data from the large sonobuoy fields used by the Sonobuoy Missile Impact Location System (SMILS) which supported the Navy's fleet ballistic missile program testing. The aircraft modifications enabled the aircraft to receive and record more sonobuoys, had a special timing system and a data monitoring and quick look capability. The Air Force Advanced Range Instrumentation Aircraft could also operate with SMILS.

Mission statement
The principal mission of VX-1 is to test and evaluate airborne anti-submarine warfare (ASW) and maritime anti-surface warfare (SUW) weapon systems, airborne strategic weapon systems, as well as support systems, equipment and materials in an operational environment. The squadron also develops, reviews and disseminates new ASW/SUW tactics and procedures for fleet use.

History

VX-1 formed during WWII in response to the German submarines threat.  The response by the United States was the commissioning of the Air Antisubmarine Commander Air Force, Atlantic Fleet, on 1 April 1943 at Quonset Point, Rhode Island.

The squadron left NAS Key West, Florida on 15 September 1973 when the squadron moved to its current home at NAS Patuxent River, Maryland.

Commanding officer
Current Commanding Officer of VX-1 is Captain William Selk, an E-2 Naval Flight Officer and United States Naval Test Pilot School graduate.

See also
History of the United States Navy
List of United States Navy aircraft squadrons

References

External links
 

Test squadrons of the United States Navy